Narva River Landscape Conservation Area is a nature park is located in Ida-Viru County, Estonia.

The area of the nature park is 14 ha.

The protected area was founded in (1959)  2010 to protect the bed and banks of Narva River.

References

Nature reserves in Estonia
Geography of Ida-Viru County